Ya tiene comisario el pueblo may refer to:

Ya tiene comisario el pueblo (1936 film), a 1936 Argentine film
Ya tiene comisario el pueblo (1967 film)